Giovanni Dolfin (or Delfino) (Venice, 22 April 1617 - Udine, 20 July 1699) was an Italian Catholic Cardinal and playwright.

Biography 
The nephew of Giovanni Delfino seniore, he was at first senator of the Republic of Venice, then, after various ecclesiastical duties he was consecrated titular bishop of Tagaste on 30 November 1656 by Carlo Carafa della Spina, Bishop of Aversa. In 1656 Girolamo Gradenigo wanted him as coadjutor in the Patriarchate of Aquileia. He succeeded him as patriarch two years later. He governed the patriarchate through his brother and nephew, who were his coadjutors with right of succession.

On the request of the Republic of Venice, on 18 July 1667 Pope Alexander VII appointed him Cardinal-Priest of San Salvatore in Lauro and then Cardinal-Deacon of Santi Vito, Modesto e Crescenzia. He was commendatory abbot of Rosazzo from 1668 until his death.

He took part in the conclave of 1667, that of 1669–1670, that of 1676, that of 1689 and finally that of 1691; during the latter he was among the principal papabili, but his election was blocked by the Spaniards who did not see favorably a Venetian on the papal throne.

While bishop, he was the principal consecrator of Alvise Sagredo, Patriarch of Venice (1678). He is buried in the tomb of his ancestors in the church of San Michele in Isola.

Works

Giovanni Delfino wrote three historical tragedies based on the traditional Counter-Reformation conflict between reason of state and love or personal ethics: Cleopatra, Lucrezia, Creso; and a free adaptation from Ariosto, Medoro, all printed posthumously. The Cleopatra was first printed in Scipione Maffei's collection Teatro italiano. The four tragedies were published in Utrecht in 1730 and re-edited in a much more correct edition by Comino in Padua in 1733 together with an apologetic Dialogo sopra le tragedie.

Delfino left two manuscripts containing ten philosophical and scientific Dialogues in prose. He appears to be very well versed in the New Science, discusses Pierre Gassendi’s and Galileo’s theories and Lucretius' atomism. Only one of his prose Dialogues - dedicated to astronomy - has been published.

References

External links
 
 
 

17th-century Italian cardinals
17th-century Italian dramatists and playwrights
1617 births
1699 deaths
Republic of Venice clergy
17th-century Venetian people
17th-century Venetian writers